New York's 1st State Senate district is one of 63 districts in the New York State Senate. It has been represented by Republican Anthony Palumbo since 2021, succeeding fellow Republican Kenneth LaValle.

Geography
District 1 covers the eastern end of Suffolk County on Long Island, including the towns of East Hampton, Southold, Shelter Island, Southampton, and Riverhead, as well as some of eastern Brookhaven.

The district is located entirely within New York's 1st congressional district, and overlaps with the 1st, 2nd, 3rd, and 4th districts of the New York State Assembly.

Recent election results

2020

2018

2016

2014

2012

Federal results in District 1

List of office holders

References 

01